Thomas Enqvist and Mark Philippoussis were the defending champions but Philippoussis did not compete. Enqvist played alongside Jamie Delgado but they were eliminated in the round robin.

Goran Ivanišević and Ivan Ljubičić defeated Wayne Ferreira and Sébastien Grosjean in the final, 6–3, 1–6, [10–5] to win the gentlemen's invitation doubles tennis title at the 2015 Wimbledon Championships.

Draw

Final

Group A
Standings are determined by: 1. number of wins; 2. number of matches; 3. in two-players-ties, head-to-head records; 4. in three-players-ties, percentage of sets won, or of games won; 5. steering-committee decision.

Group B
Standings are determined by: 1. number of wins; 2. number of matches; 3. in two-players-ties, head-to-head records; 4. in three-players-ties, percentage of sets won, or of games won; 5. steering-committee decision.

References
Draw

Men's Invitation Doubles